Aug or AUG may refer to:
An abbreviation of August, the eighth month of the year in the Gregorian calendar
Augusta State Airport in Augusta, Maine (IATA Code: AUG)
Steyr AUG, an assault rifle
AUG, the most common start codon, the three-nucleotide sequence that starts translation of mRNA and encodes the amino acid methionine
Applicative Universal Grammar, a linguistic theory
Augite, a clinopyroxene mineral
An augmented chord
Augusta Railroad, defunct Arkansas railroad
Agricultural University of Georgia, Tbilisi

People
Andrus Aug (born 1972), Estonian road bicycle racer

Music
Aug (band), a New Jersey metal band